Shag is both a given name and a surname. Notable people with the name include:

Avraham-Haim Shag (1883–1958), Israeli politician
Shag Thomas (1924–1982), American professional wrestler